is a Sōtō Zen temple in Saga, Saga Prefecture, Japan. It was the bodaiji or family temple of the Ryūzōji and Nabeshima clans, many of whom are buried in its grounds.

See also

 Saga Prefectural Museum

References

External links
 Kōden-ji 

Buddhist temples in Saga Prefecture
Saga (city)
Nabeshima clan